Žeimiai Manor is a former residential manor in Žeimiai, Jonava district. Currently it is under reconstruction.

References

Manor houses in Lithuania
Classicism architecture in Lithuania